is a city located in Aichi Prefecture in the Chūbu region of Japan. , the city had an estimated population of 61,647 in 26,559 households, and a population density of 2,457 persons per km².

Geography

Tsushima is located in far western Aichi Prefecture, on the alluvial plain of the Kiso Three Rivers.

Climate
The city has a climate characterized by hot and humid summers, and relatively mild winters (Köppen climate classification Cfa).  The average annual temperature in Tsushima is 15.6 °C. The average annual rainfall is 1710 mm with September as the wettest month. The temperatures are highest on average in August, at around 27.9 °C with occasional typhoons , and lowest in January, at around 4.4 °C with occasional snow. The East Asian rainy season occurs in June.

Demographics
Per Japanese census data, the population of Tsushima has been relatively steady over the past 30 years.

Surrounding municipalities
Aichi Prefecture
Aisai
Kanie
Ama

History

Middle Ages
Tsushima developed as a monzen-machi catering to the pilgrimage traffic to the well-known Shinto shrine of Tsushima Jinja from the Muromachi period.

Early modern period
During the Sengoku period, the area was controlled by the Oda clan and subsequently in the Edo period was part of the holdings of the Owari-Tokugawa family of Owari Domain.

Late modern period
During the Meiji period, the area was organized into several villages under Ama District, Aichi Prefecture, including the village of Tsushima in 1871  with the establishment of the modern municipalities system.
During the Meiji period, the area was a center for textile production. Tsushima was elevated to town status on October 1, 1889, and to city status on March 1, 1947.

Contemporary history
Tsushima was hit by the Ise-Wan Typhoon in 1959 which caused widespread damage and flooding.

Government

Tsushima has a mayor-council form of government with a directly elected mayor and a unicameral city legislature of 18 members. The city contributes one member to the Aichi Prefectural Assembly.  In terms of national politics, the city is part of Aichi District 9 of the lower house of the Diet of Japan.

External relations

Twin towns – Sister cities

International
Sister cities
Hercules（California, United States of America）
since November 5, 1981

National
Disaster Alliance city
Kōnan（Aichi Prefecture, Chūbu region）
since September 1, 2004 
Fujioka（Gunma Prefecture, Kantō region）
since September 1, 2004 
Kasukabe（Saitama Prefecture, Kantō region）
since September 1, 2004

Education

Schools
Tsushima has eight public elementary schools and four public junior high schools operated by the city government, and three public high schools operated by the Aichi Prefectural Board of Education. There are also one high school operated by the city government.

Transportation

Railways

Conventional lines
Meitetsu
Tsushima Line：-  – (Shobata) - (Fujinami) -   -
Bisai Line：-  -

Roads

Expressways
 Higashi-Meihan Expressway

Japan National Route

Local attractions
Tsushima Shrine
The Japan Mosque of the Ahmadiyyas, largest mosque (by capacity) in Japan.

Culture

Festival
Tenno Matsuri, a festival with a history of over two hundred years. The highlight of this two-day event is the evening festival in which a dozen boats, each decorated with nearly 400 paper lanterns, float down the Tenno River.

Notable people from Tsushima
Yone Noguchi (1875–1947), poet
Mitsuharu Kaneko (1895–1975), poet
Kiyoshi Takayama (b. 1947), yakuza tycoon
Kanematsu Sugiura (1892-1979), cancer researcher

References

External links

 

 
Cities in Aichi Prefecture